The women's mass start race of the 2014–15 ISU Speed Skating World Cup 2, arranged in the Taereung International Ice Rink, in Seoul, South Korea, was held on 23 November 2014.

Martina Sáblíková of the Czech Republic won the race, while Irene Schouten of the Netherlands came second, and Ivanie Blondin of Canada came third.

Results
The race took place on Sunday, 23 November, scheduled in the afternoon session, at 14:32.

References

Women mass start
2
ISU